Charles Vane (born William George Yarrow; 2 January 1860 – 14 April 1943) was a British stage and film actor. Vane appeared in more than fifty films during the silent era including the lead in When It Was Dark (1919).

Selected filmography
 Kent, the Fighting Man (1916)
 A Bunch of Violets (1916)
 Sowing the Wind (1916)
 The Grand Babylon Hotel (1916)
 The House of Fortescue (1916)
 Boys of the Old Brigade (1916)
 The Top Dog (1918)
 The Wages of Sin (1918)
 The Man and the Moment (1918)
 Peace, Perfect Peace (1918)
 The Slave (1918)
 Whosoever Shall Offend (1919)
 The Irresistible Flapper (1919)
 Not Guilty (1919)
 When It Was Dark (1919)
 The Polar Star (1919)
 Fettered (1919)
 Splendid Folly (1919)
 The Lyons Mail (1919)
 Castles in Spain (1920)
 The Breed of the Treshams (1920)
 The Channings (1920)
 Calvary (1920)
 The Way of the World (1920)
 The Town of Crooked Ways (1920)
 Stella (1921)
 The Golden Dawn (1921)
 Mist in the Valley (1923)

References

Bibliography
 Low, Rachael. History of the British Film, 1918–1929. George Allen & Unwin, 1971.

External links

1860 births
1943 deaths
English male stage actors
English male film actors
English male silent film actors
20th-century English male actors
People from Kingston upon Thames